The 1974 Coppa Italia Final was the final of the 1973–74 Coppa Italia. The match was played on 23 May 1974 between Bologna and Palermo. Bologna won 4–3 on penalties after the match ended 1–1 after extra time. It was Bologna's second final and second victory.

Match

References 
Coppa Italia 1973/74 statistics at rsssf.com
 https://www.calcio.com/calendario/ita-coppa-italia-1973-1974-finale/2/
 https://www.worldfootball.net/schedule/ita-coppa-italia-1973-1974-finale/2/

1974
Coppa Italia Final 1974
Coppa Italia Final 1974
Association football penalty shoot-outs